William Wentworth-Fitzwilliam, Viscount Milton MP (27 July 1839 – 17 January 1877) was a British nobleman, explorer, and Liberal Party politician.

Fitzwilliam was the eldest son of William Wentworth-FitzWilliam, 6th Earl FitzWilliam, and his wife Lady Frances Harriet, daughter of George Douglas, 17th Earl of Morton, and was educated at Eton and Trinity College, Cambridge.  He was epileptic.

Arriving in Quebec City in July 1862, Milton and Dr Walter Butler Cheadle traveled across the North American continent, wintering near Fort Carlton. After a challenging and at times humorous summer they reached Victoria, BC. Together with Butler Cheadle, he traveled up the Athabasca River and in 1863 they became the first "tourists" to travel through the Yellowhead Pass.

They later co-authored "The North-West Passage by Land" and " Voyage de l'Atlantique au Pacifique, à travers le Canada", which described their expedition in considerable detail.

Following his adventure in Canada, Milton entered politics and became one of the youngest members of the House of Commons. He represented the West Riding of Yorkshire South between 1865 and 1872.

Marriage and issue

On 10 August 1867, in London, Lord Milton married Laura Maria Theresa Beauclerk (3 January 1849 – 30 March 1886 Wentworth Woodhouse), daughter of Lord Charles Beauclerk, son of the William Beauclerk, 8th Duke of St Albans. They had one son and three daughters;

Lady Laura Mary Wentworth-Wentworth-Fitzwilliam (1 February 1869 – 2 March 1936) married on 30 April 1889 to Major George Sholto Douglas. They had 5 children:
Margaret Laura Douglas (d. 2 October 1933)
Katharine Charlotte Douglas
Brigadier Archibald Sholto George Douglas (17 March 1896 – 1981)
David Sholto William Douglas (b. 26 August 1899)
Lt.-Col. John Sholto Henry Douglas (16 June 1903 – 15 October 1960)
Lady Mabel Florence Harriett Wentworth-Fitzwilliam (14 July 1870 – 26 September 1951) married on 29 July 1899 to Lt.-Col. William Mackenzie Smith
William Charles de Meuron Wentworth-Fitzwilliam, 7th Earl Fitzwilliam (25 July 1872 – 15 February 1943) married Lady Maud Dundas, daughter of 1st Marquess of Zetland (d.1967)
Lady Theresa Evelyn Vilunza Wentworth-Fitzwilliam (5 September 1875 – 1963) married on 9 December 1908 to Lt.-Col. Alan Francis Fletcher. They had 2 children:
Violet Myrtle Fletcher (b. 1909)
Crystal Fletcher (b. 20 January 1920)

Viscount Milton died on 18 January 1877, aged 37, predeceasing his father. Their son succeeded as Earl FitzWilliam in 1902 and on 17 June 1904, the daughters of Lord Milton were granted, by Royal Warrant of Precedence, the rank and precedence of daughters of an earl.

Further reading 
Anthony Bevis, "Call the Havenstreet Midwife," Thunder Bay Historical Museum Society, Papers and Records, XLIX (2021), 32-44, about the birth of their son William July 1872 at Pointe de Meuron, now part of the city of Thunder Bay, Ontario.

E. Marion Henderson, "Trousseau treasures of 1872: museum notes,” Thunder Bay Historical Museum Society, Papers and Records, XII (1984), 38-47. Cut-work needle lace (pinto tagliato) doilies made by daughters of Hudson's Bay Company officer John McIntyre and the connection to the Lady Laura (Beauclerk) Milton, wife of William Viscount Milton.

See also
Dr Walter Butler Cheadle
Wood Hall (Callaghan, Virginia), owned by Viscount Milton
Mount Fitzwilliam, a mountain at Yellowhead Pass

Notes

External links 

www.thepeerage.com
 

Canadian explorers
Pre-Confederation British Columbia people
Liberal Party (UK) MPs for English constituencies
UK MPs 1865–1868
UK MPs 1868–1874
1839 births
1877 deaths
People educated at Eton College
Heirs apparent who never acceded
Presidents of the Marylebone Cricket Club
British courtesy viscounts